Teresa Mercedes del Carmen Núñez Cornejo (born 10 September 1965) is a Chilean public administrator and politician. Núñez was the Governor of Cardenal Caro Province from 2014 to 2018.

Biography

Núñez was born in Rancagua, on 10 September 1965; the daughter of Luis Enrique Núñez Baeza and Lucy Mercedes Cornejo Barahona. She married in that same city, with Emilio José Ramírez Cáceres, on 6 January 1990.

She is an engineer in public administration, of the Academy of Christian Humanism University. Teresa Núñez has worked in the social area of several municipalities in the O'Higgins Region, and has been in charge of programmes created by public organisations like Fosis, and in NGOs related to women and families.

She was the provincial director of Prodemu, in Cachapoal Province; provincial director of Integra Foundation in Colchagua Province; councilor of the commune of Peumo between 2000 and 2004.

On 11 March 2014, President Michelle Bachelet appointed Núñez as the governor of Cardenal Caro Province, succeeding Julio Ibarra Maldonado.

References

External links 

 Biography on the Provincial Government website 

1965 births
Living people
Socialist Party of Chile politicians
Academy of Christian Humanism University alumni
Governors of provinces of Chile
Cardenal Caro Province
People from Rancagua
Women governors of provinces of Chile
Intendants of O'Higgins Region